Beauharnois may refer to:
An alternative spelling of French House of Beauharnais

Canada

Members of the House of Beauharnais
 Charles de la Boische, Marquis de Beauharnois (1670–1749), Governor General of North-American New France (fr: Nouvelle-France); places carrying his name, including: Beauharnois, Quebec and Fort Beauharnois, Minnesota
 Claude de Beauharnois de Beaumont et de Villechauve (1674–1738), French naval officer
 François de Beauharnois de la Chaussaye, Baron de Beauville (1660s–1746), French naval and colonial administrator in France and in New France (Nouvelle-France)

Places
 Beauharnois (electoral district)
 Beauharnois (Province of Canada electoral district)
 Beauharnois (provincial electoral district)
 Beauharnois, Quebec 
 Beauharnois Canal
 Fort Beauharnois
 Beauharnois—Laprairie
 Beauharnois—Salaberry
 Beauharnois-Salaberry Regional County Municipality, Quebec

Other
 Battle of Beauharnois
 Beauharnois scandal
  - Canadian Flower-class corvette
 BHS, an OVH datacenter in the city of Beauharnois, south of Montreal, Canada
 Beauharnois Hydroelectric Power Station

United States
 Fort Beauharnois, Minnesota